Here's Looking At You Kid may refer to:

"Here's looking at you, kid", a line spoken by Humphrey Bogart in the 1942 film Casablanca
"Here's Looking at You, Kid", a 1981 TV episode of the series The Greatest American Hero
Here's Looking at You, Kid, a 1982 documentary telefilm that won an Emmy Award, part of the Nova (American TV program)
"Here's Looking at You Kid", a 1983 song by John Pizzarelli from the album I'm Hip (Please Don't Tell My Father)
"Here's Lookin' At You Kid", a 1993 song by April Wine off the album Attitude (April Wine album)
"Here's Looking At You, Kid", a 2006 short story by Mike Resnick
"Here's Looking at You, Kid", a 2008 song by The Gaslight Anthem off the album The '59 Sound
"Here's looking at you kid: Mood effects on processing eye gaze as a heuristic cue", a 2010 psychology research paper written by Joseph Paul Forgas
"Here's Looking At You, Kid", a 2011 TV episode of the series My Ghost Story
"Here's Looking at You Kid", a 2018 single by Brett Dennen
"Here’s Looking at You, Kid", a 2019 radio episode of This American Life

See also

 Looking at You (disambiguation)
 Here's Looking at You (disambiguation)